Cape Willems is a cape forming the north side of the entrance to Flandres Bay on the west coast of Graham Land. First charted by the Belgian Antarctic Expedition, 1897–99, and named by Gerlache for Pierre Willems.

See also
Gerlache Strait Geology
 Bayard Islands

Headlands of Graham Land
Danco Coast